Wakatipu was a parliamentary electorate in the Otago region of New Zealand, from 1871 to 1928.

Population centres
The electorate was located in Otago and centred on Lake Wakatipu and Queenstown. Wanaka was always covered by the electorate. When the electorate was formed, it replaced the Hampden electorate (which did not, in the end, extend all the way to the east coast and thus did not include the township of Hampden itself). Through the 1927 electoral redistribution, the Wakatipu electorate was replaced by the Central Otago electorate (later renamed Otago Central).

History
The resulting  was won by Bendix Hallenstein, who resigned again in 1873. He served until the end of the parliamentary term and successfully contested the 1875 election in the  electorate.

Pyke was succeeded by Henry Manders in the 1876 election.

The  was won by William Fraser, who represented the electorate until his retirement in 1919, after which he was appointed to the Legislative Council. Fraser joined the Reform Party when it formed in 1909.

Members of Parliament
Key

Election results

1899 election

 
 
 

Table footnotes:

1873 by-election

1872 by-election

Notes

References 

Historical electorates of New Zealand
1870 establishments in New Zealand
1928 disestablishments in New Zealand
Politics of Otago
Queenstown-Lakes District